The Hong Kong Arts Development Council (ADC) is a statutory body in Hong Kong tasked with development of the arts in the territory.
	
The ADC was created in 1995, under the Hong Kong Arts Development Council Ordinance, Chapter 472, replacing the former Council of Performing Arts. It advises the government on cultural policy for Hong Kong and allocates grants, undertakes advocacy, promotion and development, and plans programmes, in support of the arts.

Governance and administration

The administration of the ADC is overseen by its (up to) 27 members, who are appointed by the Chief Executive of Hong Kong. Of these, 10 are elected by various arts organisations (or groups of organisations), each representing an art form or aspect of art. The Council includes six standing committees: the Arts Promotion Committee, Arts Support Committee, Management Committee, Audit Committee, Review Committee and Strategy Committee, as well as a group for each of the 10 'art-forms'.

Council members are appointed for three-year terms.  Members appointed from 1 January 2011 are:
 
 Wong Ying-wai, Wilfred (Chairman)
 Yan Hau-yee, Lina (Vice-chairman)
 Au Weng-hei, William
 Choi Tsz-kwan
 Chung Shu-kun, Christopher
 James Mathew Fong
 Hung Keung
 Ko Tin-lung
 Lee Kam-yin
 Man Kit-wah, Eva
 Ng Kang-fai
 Johnnie To Kei-fung
 Cheng Kam-chung 
 Choi Yick-wai
 Barbara Fei
 Ho Ho-chuen
 Leon Ko Sai-tseung
 Perry Lam
 Lo Yeung-kit, Alan
 Mok Fung-yee, Emily
 Ng Mien-hua, Nikki
 Yuen Siu-fai
 Secretary for Home Affairs or his representative
 Director of Leisure and Cultural Services or her representative
 Permanent Secretary for Education or her representative
  

In late 2012, the Council began a review and consultation of the process for election of its 10 'art-form' members, after criticism that the narrow base, which excluded both individual and commercial arts practitioners, was unrepresentative. As a result, the voter base for elections in late 2013 was expanded to 730 arts organisations and 1,492 individual arts workers.

Chairmen

Operations
The Council receives annual funding of HK$87 million from the Home Affairs Bureau.

In the year ended 31 March 2012, the ADC provided funding for the arts viz: HK$4.8 million of one-year grants, HK$20.4 million of two-year grants, HK$8.4 million of (two-year) multi-project grants, and HK$14.3 million of (one-year) project grants.

The organisation has been criticised for lacking the executive power and resources to implement policies directly, despite its claim to 'coordinate policy and planning'.

In 2013, the ADC awarded its first Critic's Prize but was promptly embroiled in controversy when the winner of the HK$50,000 award was found to have connections with at least two of the six judges. The issue led to expanded criticism of the award, such as for its exclusion of English-language entries.

Chief Executives
Day-to-day administration is led by a Chief Executive (formerly 'Secretary General'), appointed by the Council.

Publication
The ADC produces a regular newsletter of arts news, called ArtNews, every 3–4 months.

See also
 Leisure and Cultural Services Department
 Community arts
 Hong Kong Film Development Council

References

External links
 

Performing arts in Hong Kong
Hong Kong art
Arts in Hong Kong
Government agencies established in 1995
Statutory bodies in Hong Kong